Pascal Petlach (born 18 January 1999) is an Austrian footballer who plays as a defender for FCM Traiskirchen.

Club career
On 28 July 2021, he joined FCM Traiskirchen in the Austrian Regionalliga East.

References

1999 births
Living people
Austrian footballers
Austria youth international footballers
Association football defenders
FC Admira Wacker Mödling players
Austrian Football Bundesliga players
Austrian Regionalliga players